BakuBus is a company in the capital of Azerbaijan providing Baku city with an upgraded bus network. BakuBus LLC was founded on April 3, 2014, to provide passenger transport services in Baku city.

See also 
Baku Metro
BakuCard
Transport in Azerbaijan

References

External links 
 Official website of BakuBus
 Official website of AeroExpress

Official website of Baku Metropolitan 
 Official website of Baku Transport Agency

Bus transport in Azerbaijan
Transport in Baku